Krateros was a leading general of Alexander the Great.

Krateros may also refer to:
 Krateros (strategos of the Cibyrrhaeots), Byzantine admiral in the 820s
 Theodore Krateros, Byzantine general in the 830s, one of the 42 Martyrs of Amorium